Hedvig Eleonora Church is a church in central Stockholm, Sweden. It is located at Östermalm and belongs to the Church of Sweden and is parish church for Hedvig Eleonora Parish in the Diocese of Stockholm.

The church was consecrated on 21 August 1737 and is named after the Swedish Queen Hedvig Eleonora (1636–1715), wife of King Charles X of Sweden. Hedvig Eleonora Church is an octagonal church.

The church is one of Stockholm's most popular for weddings, christenings and funerals.

Notable interments
Tim Bergling (Avicii)
Matilda Widegren (1863–1938), educator and peace activist

Gallery

References

External links
Hedvig Eleonora church, Stockholm pdf 

Churches in Stockholm
Carillons
Churches in the Diocese of Stockholm (Church of Sweden)
Octagonal churches
Church buildings with domes
18th-century Lutheran churches
Churches completed in 1737
18th-century Church of Sweden church buildings
1737 establishments in Sweden